Ben McKenna may refer to:

Ben McKenna (cyclist) (1939–1992)
Ben McKenna (footballer) (born 1993)
Fictional characters:
Dr. Benjamin McKenna, main character in the film The Man Who Knew Too Much (1956)
Ben McKenna, fictional character in the novel series Tales of the City
Ben McKenna, character in the film When He's Not a Stranger